Ferdinant Rira (born 13 June 1984) is an Albanian retired footballer who played for and captained Albanian Second Division club Domozdova Prrenjas. Outside of football life, Rira is a well-known businessman who works in Përrenjas.

Club career
Rira joined first team of Domozdova at the age of 15. He stated that he first started his career as a goalkeeper and played for four years in that position, and was distinguished for his reflexes. During that time, he performed a "sweeper-keeper" playing style that made the team's coach to change his role to centre-back.

References

External links
Profile - FSHF
Albania Soccer profile

1984 births
Living people
People from Prrenjas
Albanian footballers
Association football central defenders
Domozdova Prrenjas players
Kategoria e Dytë players